Thomas Peter Wilson Parkes (born 15 January 1992) is an English professional footballer who plays as a defender for Livingston.

Club career

Leicester City

Born in Sutton-in-Ashfield, Nottinghamshire, Parkes started his career at Leicester City where he is a product of their youth academy. Parkes' first involvement with Leicester's first team came when he was named as an unused substitute as Leicester beat Swansea City 2–1 at the Walkers Stadium in the third round of the FA Cup.

Loan to Burton Albion
On 22 January 2010 Parkes joined Burton Albion on a one-month loan deal to help ease their injury crisis, making his debut the following day, playing the full 90 minutes of Burton's 2–3 come back win away at Torquay United. On 30 January Parkes agreed to extend his loan at Burton until the end of the 2009–10 season.

Loan to Yeovil Town
On 1 December 2010, Parkes secured a loan move to League One side Yeovil Town until January 2011 Parkes made two appearances for the club the first being a 0–0 draw against Colchester United in a Football League One match. The second was a 4–2 defeat to Hartlepool United in the FA Cup.

Second loan to Burton Albion
On 24 March 2011, Parkes joined Burton Albion on loan for a second time until the end of the 2010/11 season.

Third loan to Burton Albion
Parkes joined Burton Albion on a sixth month loan deal at the start of the 2011–12 season. However this came to a premature end after only three league games after Parkes suffered a broken ankle. He made his return by being named on the bench on 14 January 2012 in a match against Plymouth Argyle.

Loan To Bristol Rovers
Following the end of his loan at Burton Albion, Parkes was an unused substitute for Leicester's 2–0 victory over Swindon Town in the fourth round of the FA Cup. A few days later, Parkes joined up with fellow Leicester loanee Cian Bolger, at Bristol Rovers on an initial month-long loan deal. Parkes made his debut against Morecambe on 11 February, re-uniting his academy defensive partnership with Bolger. On 21 April, he was sent off for a dangerous two footed challenge on Port Vale's Chris Shuker; opposition manager Micky Adams defended Parkes, saying that in his experience "the boy is not that type of player".

Bristol Rovers
Tom Parkes joined Bristol Rovers for an undisclosed fee on 20 August 2012. He made his debut on 21 August 2012 in a 1–1 draw against Barnet, playing the full 90 minutes. On 18 September 2012, he scored his first goal for in a Rovers shirt in away match against west country rivals Plymouth Argyle.

On 20 November 2012, he suffered a fractured ankle in a 4–0 loss away at Port Vale at Vale Park and returned to action on 1 December 2012 in the 2–0 loss to Wycombe.

When John Ward was appointed manager in December 2012, Tom was awarded the captain's armband and has gone from strength to strength, picking up npower League 2 Player of the Month in February 2013.

In September 2013, Parkes agreed a contract extension at Rovers to keep him at the club until 2016. That season would end in disappointment for Parks and Rovers as the club were relegated out of the Football League for the first time since their election in 1920.

Parkes remained with Rovers for their first campaign in the Conference Premier as Darrell Clarke guided the side to a second place finish in the league, missing out on automatic promotion by just one point. They would however go on to seal promotion at Wembley Stadium, beating Grimsby Town in the 2015 Conference Premier play-off Final. Parkes made 51 appearances in all competitions during the season, the most of any player at the club, and was named Bristol Rovers' player of the year at the end of the campaign.

The 2015–16 season saw Parkes struggle to hold down a regular place in the side as Mark McChrystal and Tom Lockyer were generally favoured in the centre back positions. Rovers went on to secure back-to-back promotions to League One following a 92nd minute winning goal from Lee Brown. Parkes, along with the rest of Rovers' senior players, was offered a new deal at the club. He elected to bring his time at Rovers to an end though, deciding to join Leyton Orient

Carlisle United
He was offered a new contract by Carlisle at the end of the 2018–19 season.

Exeter City
On 27 May 2019, Parkes joined Exeter City. In August 2019 he received a three-match ban for violent conduct. He scored his first goal for the club in the 4-0 derby demolition of local rivals Plymouth Argyle.

On 12 May 2021 it was announced that he would leave Exeter at the end of the season, following the expiry of his contract.

Livingston
On 3 June 2021, Parkes agreed to join Livingston following the expiration of his Exeter contract, signing a one-year contract with the potential to rise to three years. Parkes scored one minute into his competitive debut for the club, when he opened the scoring in an eventual 3–0 victory over Brechin City.

International career
At international level, Parkes has represented England at under-17 level 18 times, scoring once. Parkes was a member of the unsuccessful England Under-17 squad for the 2009 UEFA European Under-17 Football Championship.

Personal life
Parkes was prosecuted in July 2016 for drink driving after crashing his stepfather's car in the Leamington area of Sutton-in-Ashfield.

Career statistics

Honours
Bristol Rovers
Conference Premier play-offs: 2015

Individual
Conference Premier Team of the Year: 2014–15

References

External links

1992 births
Living people
Sportspeople from Sutton-in-Ashfield
Footballers from Nottinghamshire
English footballers
England youth international footballers
Association football defenders
Leicester City F.C. players
Burton Albion F.C. players
Yeovil Town F.C. players
Bristol Rovers F.C. players
Leyton Orient F.C. players
Carlisle United F.C. players
Exeter City F.C. players
Livingston F.C. players
English Football League players